Lazar Grbović (born October 29, 2000) is a Serbian college basketball player for Arkansas State Red Wolves of the Sun Belt Conference.

Playing career 
Grbović started his basketball career with the youth team of Kolubara Lazarevac.

Grbović was promoted to Dynamic BG for the 2016–17 season. On October 8, 2016, he made a professional debut in a win against Metalac. On November 11, 2017, he made a Second ABA League debut with Dynamic in a win against AV Ohrid.

National team career 
Grbović was a member of the Serbian under-19 team that finished 7th at the 2019 FIBA Under-19 Basketball World Cup in Heraklion, Greece. Over five tournament games, he averaged 1.0 point, 1.6 rebounds and 0.6 assists per game.

References

External links 
 Profile at aba-liga.com
 Player Profile at realgm.com

2000 births
Living people
Basketball League of Serbia players
Basketball players from Belgrade
KK Dynamic players
KK Proleter Zrenjanin players
KK Vršac players
Serbian expatriate basketball people in the United States
Serbian men's basketball players
Small forwards